In Māori tradition, Taikōria was one of the great ocean-going, voyaging canoes that was used in the migrations that settled New Zealand. Captained by Ruatāmore, the Taikōria landed with the Kahutara and the Ōkoki at Ngāmotu near New Plymouth.

See also
List of Māori waka

References

Māori waka
Māori mythology